Xylosma hawaiensis is a species of flowering plant in the family Salicaceae, that is endemic to Hawaii. Common names include Hawai'i brushholly, maua, and ae (Maui only).

Description
Young leaves are bronze green, reddish, or copper-colored with red veins, aging to shiny dark green on top and slightly shiny green on bottom. Twigs are initially dark red and mature to a dark brown.

Habitat

References

External links

hawaiensis
Endemic flora of Hawaii
Trees of Hawaii
Flora without expected TNC conservation status